Rampino is a surname. Notable people with the surname include:

 Michael R. Rampino (born 1948), American geologist
 Rocco Rampino (born 1983), Italian DJ and producer Congorock
 Tony Rampino (1939–2010), American mobster

Italian-language surnames